Gary King (born December 8, 1958) is an American political scientist and quantitative methodologist. He is the Albert J. Weatherhead III University Professor and Director for the Institute for Quantitative Social Science at Harvard University. King and his research group develop and apply empirical methods in many areas of social science research, focusing on innovations that span the range from statistical theory to practical application.

Biography
In 1980, King graduated summa cum laude with a Bachelor of Arts degree in political science from the State University of New York at New Paltz. In 1981 he earned a Master of Arts degree and in 1984 a Doctor of Philosophy degree in political science at the University of Wisconsin–Madison in Madison.

King's career in academia began in 1984, when he became an assistant professor in the Department of Politics at New York University. He joined the faculty of Harvard's Department of Government in 1987 and has taught there since. He has also been a visiting fellow at Oxford University. To date, he has authored or coauthored eight books (six published and one forthcoming) and more than 175 journal articles and book chapters, and has won more than 55 prizes and awards for his work.

King is one of 25 professors with "Harvard's most distinguished faculty title".

He is the step-brother of the sociologist Mitchell Duneier.

Business
King co-founded the data analytics companies Crimson Hexagon and Learning Catalytics and the educational technology companies Perusall and OpenScholar. Crimson Hexagon and its nearest competitor merged in 2018; the new company is called Brandwatch.   Learning Catalytics was acquired by Pearson in April 2013.

Honors

 Fellow, Guggenheim Foundation, 1994-5
 Fellow, American Academy of Arts and Sciences, 1998
 Fellow, American Association for the Advancement of Science, 2004
 Fellow, American Academy of Political and Social Science 2004
 Fellow, Society for Political Methodology, 2008 (Gosnell Prize from the Society in 1997 and 1999)
 Fellow, American Statistical Association 2009
 Fellow, National Academy of Sciences, 2010
 Fellow, National Academy of Social Insurance, 2014

Selected publications

Demographic Forecasting (Princeton, NJ: Princeton University Press, 2008), with Federico Girosi.
 "How Censorship in China Allows Government Criticism but Silences Collective Expression", American Political Science Review, Vol. 107, No. 2, pp. 1–18. With Jennifer Pan and Margaret E. Roberts.
Ecological Inference: New Methodological Strategies (New York: Cambridge University Press, 2004), edited with Ori Rosen and Martin A. Tanner.
A Solution to the Ecological Inference Problem: Reconstructing Individual Behavior from Aggregate Data (Princeton, NJ: Princeton University Press, 1997).
Designing Social Inquiry: Scientific Inference in Qualitative Research (Princeton, NJ: Princeton University Press, 1994), with Robert Keohane and Sidney Verba.
Unifying Political Methodology: The Likelihood Theory of Statistical Inference (Cambridge, UK and New York: Cambridge University Press, 1989; reprinted Ann Arbor, MI: University of Michigan Press, 1998).
The Elusive Executive: Discovering Statistical Patterns in the Presidency (Washington, D.C.: Congressional Quarterly Press, 1988), with Lyn Ragsdale.
The Presidency in American Politics (New York and London: New York University Press, 1989), with Paul Brace and Christine Harrington.

See also
Ecological validity
Quantitative research

References

External links
 
 IQSS: The Institute for Quantitative Social Science, Harvard University

1958 births
Living people
American political scientists
Harvard University faculty
New York University faculty
Writers from Cambridge, Massachusetts
Scientists from Madison, Wisconsin
State University of New York at New Paltz alumni
University of Wisconsin–Madison College of Letters and Science alumni
Fellows of the American Academy of Arts and Sciences
Fellows of the American Association for the Advancement of Science
Fellows of the American Statistical Association
Members of the United States National Academy of Sciences
Mathematicians from New York (state)
Fellows of the American Academy of Political and Social Science